Sphingomonas histidinilytica  is a Gram-negative and non-spore-forming bacteria from the genus of Sphingomonas which has been isolated from hexachlorocyclohexane contaminated soil from a dump site in Ummari near Lucknow in Uttar Pradesh in India.

References

Further reading

External links
Type strain of Sphingomonas histidinilytica at BacDive -  the Bacterial Diversity Metadatabase	

histidinilytica
Bacteria described in 2010